Heber Carl Jentzsch (born November 30, 1935) is an American Scientologist who served as the president of the Church of Scientology International from 1982 to around 2010.
Jentzsch is listed as missing, and the Church of Scientology International will not disclose any other information regarding him.

Early life
Heber Jentzsch was born in 1935 in Salt Lake City and grew up in a Mormon family and named after Latter-day Saint apostle Heber C. Kimball. Though he was never baptized into the Church of Jesus Christ of Latter-day Saints, he identified himself as a "believing Mormon".

He is the son of polygamist Carl Jentzsch and Pauline, Carl's third of eight wives; Heber has 42 siblings. In 1955 Carl was arrested, and excommunicated from the Church of Jesus Christ of Latter-day Saints.

Heber Jentzsch was educated at Weber College in Ogden, Utah and the University of Utah, where he graduated in 1959 with a degree in communications. He also studied Eastern religions.

Before 1967, Jentzsch worked as a journalist for the Los Angeles Free Press and an actor, having a bit part in the film Paint Your Wagon. He played a small part in an episode of the 1960s television series Combat!, and an uncredited role in the film 1776.

Scientology

Jentzsch joined the Church of Scientology in 1967 after allegedly being cured by the Scientology Purification Rundown of radiation burns he had suffered since he was 15.

During the 1970s, Jentzsch became the public relations director of the later-notorious Guardian's Office, serving as the Church of Scientology's chief press spokesman. He has continued in this role since his promotion to the post of President of the Church of Scientology International in 1982. In January 1986, Jentzsch faced the press on behalf of the Church to announce the death of L. Ron Hubbard. He has often appeared in newspaper interviews, aggressively defending the church on several occasions. Despite his media prominence, Jentzsch has been called a titular president. He is sometimes described as "the leading spokesperson for the Church of Scientology International" in church publications.

Arrest and trial in Spain

In 1988 Heber Jentzsch was arrested in Spain along with 69 other members of Scientology. Jentzsch was incarcerated in a Spanish jail for about three weeks. He was released and fled to the United States after Scientology paid a bail bond of approximately $1 million. Sixteen people, including Jentzsch, were charged with "illegal association" and various other crimes including tax fraud and endangering public health. The trial of the indictees began in February 2001, but Jentzsch himself did not appear; the prosecution called for him to be given a 56-year prison sentence. However, the Madrid Provincial Court dismissed all but the conspiracy charge and eventually ruled (in absentia) that the prosecution had presented insufficient evidence to prove this charge as well, and in April 2002, the last charge was formally dropped.

Marriage and children

Heber Jentzsch was married to Australian Scientologist Yvonne Gillham (née Harding-Wilson) from 1972 until her death from cancer in 1978. From 1978 to 1988 he was married to then-Scientologist Karen de la Carriere (b. 1944); according to her, Jentzsch was pressured by David Miscavige to divorce her. In September 2010 de la Carriere left the church and became an anti-Scientology activist. A son, Alexander Jentzsch, from his marriage to de la Carriere, passed away from untreated pneumonia in July 2012 at age 27 while staying with in-laws.

Disappearance
After serving as a main spokesperson for Scientology throughout the 1980s and 1990s, Heber Jentzsch stopped making public appearances in the early 2000s. According to multiple sources he was taken to The Hole at Gold Base around that time as part of a purge of senior executives within Scientology ordered by Miscavige. There he and other inmates had to live in cramped conditions in a small office bungalow without beds or proper sanitary facilities.

According to Karen de la Carriere, Jentzsch was able to visit their son Alexander for one day in 2010 and gave him a cellphone number to keep contact. Later that year Alexander found the cellphone number disconnected. This was supposedly the last time Alexander and Heber saw each other before Alexander's death in 2012. 

Over the years there have been several instances of relatives trying to reach Heber Jentzsch and to verify his wellbeing. His brother David Jentzsch recalled speaking to Heber around 2002 and again in 2005 or 2006 where he revealed that he had been threatened with his life by Scientology and that he wouldn't be allowed to leave. By 2012 he hadn't been able to contact Heber for a while. However he had learned that his brother attended a memorial service for Alexander that year. In 2018 Heber's niece Tammy Clark received a letter in response to a birthday card supposedly written by him personally. Clark however questioned the authenticity. She then requested support by the local police at Gold Base to be able to verify her uncle's wellbeing. According to her account the police first agreed but then went into Gold Base without her being present. A police report subsequently confirmed Heber Jentzsch to be present at Gold Base, seemingly being well but being supervised by a "full-time nurse" throughout the meeting.

Scientology removed Jentzsch's biography from its website between 2009 and 2010 and now doesn't mention his name on any of their websites.

Articles
 Jentzsch, Heber (2000-04-21). "Liberty, Equality, Intolerance", Los Angeles Times.
 Jentzsch, Heber (1998-02-25). "German Scientologists" (letter to the Editor), New York Times.

References

External links

American Scientologists
1935 births
Former Latter Day Saints
Converts from Mormonism
Converts to new religious movements from Christianity
Living people
Scientology officials
University of Utah alumni
Weber State University alumni